Passagenwerk or Arcades Project was an unfinished project of German philosopher and cultural critic Walter Benjamin, written between 1927 and 1940. An enormous collection of writings on the city life of Paris in the 19th century, it was especially concerned with Paris' iron-and-glass covered "arcades" (known in French as the passages couverts de Paris).

Benjamin's Project, which many scholars believe might have become one of the great texts of 20th-century cultural criticism, was never completed due to his suicide on the French-Spanish border in 1940. The Arcades Project has been posthumously edited and published in many languages as a collection of unfinished reflections. The work is mainly written in German, yet also contains French-language passages, mainly quotes.

Overview
Parisian arcades began to be constructed around the beginning of the nineteenth century and were sometimes destroyed as a result of Baron Haussmann's renovation of Paris during the Second French Empire (ca. 1850–1870). Benjamin linked them to the city's distinctive street life and saw them as providing one of the habitats of the flâneur (i.e., a person strolling in a locale to experience it). 

Benjamin first mentioned the Arcades Project in a 1927 letter to his friend Gershom Scholem, describing it as his attempt to use collage techniques in literature. Initially, Benjamin saw the Arcades as a small article he would finish within a few weeks.

However, Benjamin's vision of the Arcades Project grew increasingly ambitious in scope until he perceived it as representing his most important creative accomplishment. On several occasions Benjamin altered his overall scheme of the Arcades Project, due in part to the influence of Theodor Adorno, who gave Benjamin a stipend and who expected Benjamin to make the Arcades project more explicitly political and Marxist in its analysis.

It contains sections (convolutes) on Arcades, Fashion, Catacombs, iron constructions, exhibitions, advertising, Interior design, Baudelaire, The Streets of Paris, Panoramas and Dioramas, Mirrors, Painting, Modes of Lighting, Railroads, Charles Fourier, Marx, Photography, Mannequins, Social movements, Daumier's caricatures, Literary History, the Stock exchange, Lithography, and the Paris Commune.

It influenced Marshal McLuhan's studies in media theory.

Structure 
The project's structure is idiosyncratic. The convolutes correspond to letters of the alphabet; the individual sections of text— sometimes individual lines, sometimes multi-paragraph analyses —are ordered with square brackets, starting from [A1,1]. This numbering system comes from the pieces of folded paper that Benjamin wrote on, with [A1a,1] denoting the third page of his 'folio.' Additionally, Benjamin included cross-references at the end of some sections. These were denoted by small boxes enclosing the word (e.g., ■ Fashion ■).

The sections of text are at times Benjamin's own thoughts, and at other times consecutive quotations. These two types of textual sections are differentiated in their typography, with a large typeface for his writing and a smaller one for citations. This convention comes from the German version, but has no basis in Benjamin's manuscript. The convolutes also make extensive use of epigraphs from obscure publications.

Publication history 
The notes and manuscript for the Arcades Project and much of Benjamin's correspondence had been entrusted to Benjamin's friend Georges Bataille before Benjamin fled Paris under Nazi occupation. Bataille, who worked as a librarian at the Bibliothèque Nationale, hid the manuscript in a closed archive at the library where it was eventually discovered after the war.

The full text of Benjamin's unfinished magnum opus was published in English translation by Harvard University Press in 1999 after years of difficult editorial work undertaken by Rolf Tiedemann, the editor of the landmark 1982 German edition. The book is hailed by some as one of the milestones of 20th-century literary criticism, history and critical theory. Others, such as Mark Lilla, describe the Arcades project as one of Benjamin's lesser works, suggesting that its importance has been vastly overstated. Lilla argues that apart from occasional flashes of humor and insight, Benjamin's surviving version of the Arcades Project is largely tedious and uninteresting.

The publication of the Arcades Project has given rise to controversy over the methods employed by the editors and their decisions involving the ordering of the fragments. Critics argue that this reconstruction makes the book akin to a multi-layered palimpsest.  The Arcades Project, as it stands, is often claimed to be a forerunner to postmodernism.

Notes

Bibliography

Primary source 
 Howard Eiland and Kevin McLaughlin (Translators)

Secondary sources 

Susan Buck-Morss. The Dialectics of Seeing: Walter Benjamin and the Arcades Project (Studies in Contemporary German Social Thought), Boston: MIT Press, 1991, 505 pages. (English) 
Federico Castigliano, Flâneur. The Art of Wandering the Streets of Paris, 2017. 
Beatrice Hanssen (ed) Walter Benjamin And the Arcades Project (Walter Benjamin Studies), London: Continuum International Publishing Group, 2006), 256 pages. (English) .
 David Kishik, "The Manhattan Project: A Theory of a City." (Stanford: Stanford University Press, 2015), 288 pages.  (cloth) –  (paper)

External links
 The Arcades Project, Harvard University Press, 
"The Structure of Awakening: Walter Benjamin and Progressive Scholarship in New Media" from The Arcades Project Project

2002 non-fiction books
Frankfurt School
Books about Paris
Works by Walter Benjamin
Works about Charles Baudelaire